The Road Not Taken is the second studio album by American country music group Shenandoah and their most successful album to date. Of the six singles released from 1988 to 1990, all charted within the top ten and three of those, "The Church on Cumberland Road", "Sunday in the South", and "Two Dozen Roses" were number 1 songs on both the U.S. and Canadian country charts. Also included on the disc is "She Doesn't Cry Anymore", a single from the band's self-titled debut from 1987.

Track listing

Release history

Personnel
Shenandoah
 Marty Raybon (vocals, rhythm guitar)
 Jim Seales (lead guitar)
 Stan Thorn (keyboards)
 Ralph Ezell (bass guitar)
 Mike McGuire (drums)
Additional musicians
 Walt Aldridge
 Wayne Bridges
 Robert Byrne
 Vassar Clements
 Bill Darnell
 Paul Franklin
 Owen Hale
 Bill Hinds
 Lenny LeBlanc
 Mac McAnally
 Steve Nathan
 Hershey Reeves
 Milton Sledge
 John Willis
Technical
Robert Byrne - production, engineering
Pete Greene - engineering
Rick Hall - production, engineering
M. C. Rather - engineering
Alan Schulman - engineering

Charts

Weekly charts

Year-end charts

Certifications

References

1989 albums
Columbia Records albums
Shenandoah (band) albums